Weirder & Weirder is the seventh studio album by Australian indie rock band Ball Park Music, released on 27 May 2022 through Prawn Records. It peaked at number 2 on the ARIA Albums Chart and was nominated for Best Independent Album and Best Rock Album at the 2022 ARIA Awards. Lead single "Sunscreen" polled at number 21 in the Triple J Hottest 100 of 2021 and "Stars in My Eyes" polled at number eight in the 2022 countdown.

Background 
In October 2020, the band released their sixth studio album Ball Park Music, which peaked at number 2 on the ARIA Albums Chart. At the 2021 ARIA Awards, it was nominated for Best Independent Release and Best Rock Album. The same month as the album's release, the band was featured on Triple J's Like a Version segment, covering Radiohead's "Paranoid Android".

Release 
The band's first new track since 2020, "Sunscreen", was released as the lead single for a then-untitled seventh album, alongside a music video on 28 October 2021. In Triple J's Hottest 100 of 2021, the track polled at number 21.

In February 2022, Ball Park Music announced their seventh album would be titled Weirder & Weirder and that it would release on 3 June. However, this release date was later pushed forward to 27 May. Upon the announcement of the album and its artwork, which was designed by artist Polly Bass Boost, frontman Samuel Cromack wrote via social media:For more than a year we danced and dodged, fought and flirted with this music. Sometimes we had focused, frenzied periods of intense work; recordings popped up like daisies every which way you looked. Other times we thawed; the soft, slow heartbeat of the process swinging us far and wide with self-doubt. "Stars in My Eyes" followed as the album's second single in February, described by Ellie Robinson of NME as bearing "retro pop influences" with a "lowkey slate of jangly, slightly fuzzy strums and frontman Sam Cromack’s wistful tenor". "Manny", the third and final single, was released in May.

Upon the album's release, it was made Triple J's Feature Album. The band embarked on the nationwide Weirder & Weirder Tour on 3 June 2022, their first headlining show in three years, supported by King Stingray, Teenage Joans and Rat!Hammock.

Reception 
Dylan Marshall of music publication the AU Review, in a four-and-a-half star review, called the album "fantastic and contemplative" with a "renewed sense of adventure, joyousness, reflection and awareness", particularly praising the album's messages. Noel Mengel of Loud Mouth praised the album as some of the band's best work, writing "the more you play Weirder and Weirder the more it sounds like a greatest hits set".

Penultimate single "Stars in My Eyes" has been favoured by various publications to win Triple J's Hottest 100 of 2022, ultimately appearing in number eight in the countdown. The album also appeared at number two in Triple J's poll for the top ten albums of 2022, marking the band's seventh appearance on the list, with every prior studio album placing in past polls.

Track listing 
All tracks written by Samuel Cromack, except for "Beautiful Blueberries" written by Dean Hanson.

Personnel 
Musicians
 Sam Cromack – lead vocals, electric guitar ; writing , acoustic guitar , percussion , organ 
 Jennifer Boyce – vocals , bass guitar , Roland SH-101 
 Daniel Hanson – drums , tambourine , vocals 
 Dean Hanson – electric guitar , acoustic guitar , Hofner bass guitar , writing , vocals 
 Paul Furness – Roland SH-101 , synthesiser , piano , Wurlitzer , vocals , trombone , harpsichord , mellotron , organ 
 Sam Furness – trumpet 
 Emma Kelly – strings, arrangements 
 Violet Hanson – counting 
 Enid Cromack – counting 
 Joel Walker – claps 

Technical
 Sam Cromack – recording
 Paul McKercher – mixing
 William Bowden – mastering
 Polly Bass Boost – artwork

Charts

References 

2022 albums
Ball Park Music albums
Albums produced by Sam Cromack